Music Hour may refer to:

Radio shows
Bing Crosby's radio show, the Kraft Music Hour
CKUA radio's hour-and-a-half Music Hour
Music Appreciation Hour

Music
The Music Hour, educational book by Horatio Parker
Music Hour (Porno Graffitti song), a Japanese song by Porno Graffitti.